The 1948 Southern Jaguars football team was an American football team that represented Southern University in the 1948 college football season. In their 13th season under head coach Ace Mumford, the Jaguars compiled a 12–0 record, won the SWAC championship, shut out eight of 12 opponents, and outscored all opponents by a total of 395 to 33. The team played its home games at University Stadium in Baton Rouge, Louisiana. The team was recognized as the black college national champion.

Schedule

References

Southern
Southern Jaguars football seasons
Southwestern Athletic Conference football champion seasons
Black college football national champions
College football undefeated seasons
Southern Jaguars football